Gromki is a rural locality (a selo) and the administrative center of Gromkovskoye Rural Settlement, Rudnyansky District, Volgograd Oblast, Russia. The population was 470 as of 2010. There are 11 streets.

Geography 
Stary Kondal is the nearest rural locality.

References 

Rural localities in Rudnyansky District, Volgograd Oblast